Lacerum or lacer from Latin may refer to:

In anatomy and medicine:
Foramen lacerum, a triangular hole in the base of the skull 
Lacerum segment, a part of the course of the internal carotid artery
In biology:
Animals:
Lepton lacerum, a species of saltwater clam in the family Lasaeidae
Plants:
Trichocentrum lacerum, a species of orchid found from Central America to Colombia
Moxostoma lacerum or Harlip sucker, an extinct species of ray-finned fish in the family Catostomidae